Ove Joensen (3 December 1948 – 26 November 1987) was a Faroese seaman and adventurer, the first to row from the Faroe Islands to Denmark.

Early life
Ove Joensen, born in 1948 in Tórshavn, Faroe Islands, was the son of a fisherman and after moving to the Island of Nólsoy had a seafaring career.

Ocean crossing
On his first attempt later that year the boat was damaged when visiting a ship. Diverting to the Shetland Islands, he was towed in from Eshaness by the Aith lifeboat. The following year Joensen's attempt was defeated by adverse winds after he had again reached Aith.

Joensen finally succeeded in 1986, when he arrived in Copenhagen on 11 August 1986 after 41 days rowing alone. Thousands of people greeted him, both in the Danish capital and on his return to Nólsoy. The Danes called him Ro-Ove (Row-Ove).

Death
On the night of 24 November 1987, returning from Runavik, Joensen drowned in Skálafjørður-inlet after falling overboard, though his body was not found until two days later.

The civic festival Ovastevna is held each August on Nólsoy to commemorate Ove Joensen. His boat Diana Victoria is preserved in Nólsoy in the basement of the café and Tourist Information Centre, near the ferry port. There is also a monument to him next to the whale bones that form an ornamental entrance to the village, and another in the village of Aith, Shetland Isles. Joensen is buried in the cemetery of Nólsoy, overlooking the sea.

Personal life
Joenson had 3 children, Christina, Sharlotte Rose, and Bo.

Literature 
 Kirstin Didriksen, Ragnhild Joensen: Ove, Egið forlag, 1989

References 

“The Rooftops of Copenhagen” - song by Tom Russell

Notes

1948 births
1987 deaths
People from Tórshavn
Ocean rowers
Faroese male rowers